Çomixon Muxiddinov (born on 15 April 1976) is a retired Tajikistani footballer. He was a member of the Tajikistan national football team in the 2010 FIFA World Cup qualification campaign.

Career Stats

International

Statistics accurate as of match played 26 June 2010

International Goals

Honours
Khujand
Tajik Cup (1):2002
Regar-TadAZ
Tajik Cup (1):2005
Parvoz Bobojon Ghafurov
Tajik Cup (1):2007
Vakhsh Qurghonteppa
Tajik League (1): 2009

References

1976 births
Living people
Tajikistani footballers
Tajikistan international footballers
Association football forwards
Tajikistan Higher League players